Meder is a surname. Notable people with the surname include:

Reinhold Meder (*1966), German musician
Jamie Meder (born 1991), American football player
Johann Valentin Meder (1649–1719), German composer

Meder/Medr may also refer to the Ethiopian, Aksumite, earth god.